Shalpin is an administrative unit, known as Union council, of Swat District in the Khyber Pakhtunkhwa province of Pakistan. Union council Shalpin has 3 village councils i.e. Shalpin, Faqira and Bawrai.
Village council Faqira includes the following villages: 
Faqira, Banda, Sholgara and Karal etc.
Shalpin is a village of Swat District situated 32 kilometres away from Mingaora. Elevation of the area is 4,300 ft. The most cultivated crops of the area are Wheat and Maize. Shalpin is also famous for its fruits like Peaches locally named is Shaltaloo, Apricots and Persimons. The Shalpin valley is diverse in vegetation. Pashtu is the most common language although few families in the mountain areas maybe speaking kohistani and gujri. Shalpin has a public high School for boys and girls and two private middle Schools. Shalpin also has a basic health Unit. People of Shalpin are highly educated and several alumni of high school are serving at different key positions in the country and abroad.   

District Swat has 9 Tehsils i.e. Khwazakhela, Kabal, Madyan, Barikot, Mingora, and Kalam. Each Tehsill comprises certain numbers of union councils. There are 65 union councils in district Swat, 56 rural and 9 urban.

See also 

 Swat District

References

External links
Khyber-Pakhtunkhwa Government website section on Lower Dir
United Nations
Hajjinfo.org Uploads
 PBS paiman.jsi.com

Swat District
Populated places in Swat District
Union councils of Khyber Pakhtunkhwa
Union Councils of Swat District